C48 or C-48 may refer to:

 C-48 (Michigan county highway)
 C48 road (Namibia)
 Bill C-48, various legislation of the Parliament of Canada
 Caldwell 48, a spiral galaxy
 Douglas C-48, an American military transport
 Four Knights Game, a chess opening
 , a Fiji-class light cruiser of the Royal Navy